Vincenzo Bettoni (1 July 1881, Melegnano - 4 November 1954, Milan) was an Italian operatic bass who performed internationally from 1902 to 1950. He was a resident artist at La Scala in Milan from 1926 to 1940, and afterwards continued to appear periodically as a guest artist at that house through 1950. Other opera houses he sang with during his career included the Liceu, the Royal Opera House in London, the Teatro Colón, the Teatro di San Carlo, the Teatro Regio in Turin, the Vienna State Opera, and the Zurich Opera among others.

References

External links
 

1881 births
1954 deaths
People from Melegnano
Operatic basses
20th-century Italian male opera singers